George Henry Noonan (August 20, 1828 – August 17, 1907) was a U.S. Representative from Texas who was born in Newark, New Jersey. He was the first Republican congressman from Texas to be elected after the end of Reconstruction. Prior to his election in 1894, he had served as an elected state judge since 1862.

Early life and education
Born in Newark, New Jersey in 1828, Noonan received a liberal education. He studied law and was admitted to the bar. He started to practice law.

Career
At the age of 24, Noonan migrated west, moving to Texas in 1852. He settled in Castroville in Medina County. He set up a private practice and became politically active.

Noonan was elected as judge of the eighteenth judicial district of Texas in 1862 and served until 1894, when he resigned. He lived in San Antonio.

Noonan was elected as a Republican to the Fifty-fourth Congress (March 4, 1895 – March 3, 1897), the first to be elected to federal office in Texas since the end of Reconstruction. Among Noonan's backers was George B. Jackson, an African-American businessman called the "wealthiest black in Texas" in the second half of the 19th century. Jackson was among the founders of the Republican Party in Tom Green County in the 1890s.

Noonan was defeated in his campaign for reelection in 1896 to the Fifty-fifth Congress. He resumed the practice of law in San Antonio and died there on August 17, 1907. He is interred at St. Mary's Cemetery in the city.

References

External links

1828 births
1907 deaths
Politicians from Newark, New Jersey
Politicians from San Antonio
Texas state court judges
Republican Party members of the United States House of Representatives from Texas
19th-century American politicians
19th-century American judges
Lawyers from San Antonio